Ian Brooker is a character actor, with experience of theatre, television and film. However, it is in the medium of radio and audio drama that he is best known.

Ian Anthony Brooker is the ninth generation of a theatrical family that first went on stage in the mid eighteenth century. Relatives have included leading theatrical and literary figures such as Dame Madge Kendal (Mrs Kendal in The Elephant Man) (1848–1935), dramatists such as Thomas William Robertson (1829–1871) – author of the play Caste, the screenwriter Philip MacDonald (1900–80) – author of the Boris Karloff film The Body Snatcher, and several Charlie Chan and Mr. Moto films; Harry Duff (1895–1984) – the boy actor who played both Michael and John Darling in the original production and revival of the play Peter Pan; the French actress, Rachel Berendt who studied with Sarah Bernhardt and who married the film, stage and television actor Pierre Fresnay; and Carol Robertson – producer of the BBC's Tales of Beatrix Potter and Oscar (starring Michael Gambon as Oscar Wilde).

Radio
Productions for BBC Radio 4 have included: The Door in the Wall based upon three short stories by H.G.Wells, the comedy cricketing series, Memoirs of a Twelfth Man (with Norman Rodway), E. Nesbit's Five Children and It and its sequel, The Story of the Amulet, Charlie and the Great Glass Elevator, Ellis Peters' The Flight of a Witch, Rose Tremain's One Night in Winter, David Pownall's Façade (with David Tennant), Watership Down, Mr Foster's Good Fairy, and The Day They Wouldn't Take It Any More. He played Gaius Flavius Hilaris in the adaptation of Lindsey Davis' first Falco story The Silver Pigs.

On Radio 3, he has appeared in Peter Tinniswood's translation of Eduardo de Philippo's The Monument, and Lizzie Hopley's play Salome.

Since 1999 he has made occasional appearances as Wayne Foley of Radio Borsetshire in Radio 4's The Archers. He has also supplied the voices of Elgar and Berlioz for Radio 4's Married to the Music, and Thomas Hardy in Ramblings.

Television
On television, Ian appeared as the injured astronaut, Henry Carson in Andromeda TV's Jupiter Moon (1990), and Saint Dominic in the Channel 4 series, Gnostics (1986). More recently, he has appeared as an abusive father, Peter Case, in BBC 1's Doctors and Malcolm Hammond – an ineffectual father of a schizophrenic girl in BBC 1's Casualty. In 2013 Ian appeared as Gavin Lynch, the coroner's investigator in two episodes of Doctors.  He appeared as the notorious doctor, Harold Shipman, in a BBC drama-documentary broadcast in two episodes in April 2014.  Aired in 2020, he appeared as a bishop in the final series of Vikings.

Theatre
In theatre, he played Neville in an acclaimed production of Neville's Island at Harrogate Theatre, and all seven male roles in Jim Cartright's play Two performed at the Stara Prokhownia, Warsaw, Poland. In 2005, Ian appeared as George Silverlock, the Master of the Hastings Workhouse in Claire Luckham's play Kitty and Kate – a co-production for the New Victoria Theatre, Stoke and Stephen Joseph Theatre, Scarborough.

Audio recordings
Since 2001 he has played many characters for Big Finish's Doctor Who range including ROSM in Embrace the Darkness, Minister Voss in The Last, the torturer, Twyst in Something Inside, Surus the Elephant in Auld Mortality, Sydney the Juliet Bravo fan in Deadline (with Sir Derek Jacobi), the Shewstone in A Storm of Angels, Romilly and the Krotons in Return of the Krotons, the President of Earth in An Earthly Child, and was the briefest of all the Doctors in Full Fathom Five. He has often worked with director/writer Nicholas Briggs on his four Dalek Empire and two Cyberman series. In 2004 he played the archaeologist, Professor Golightly, in Noise Monster Productions series Space: 1889 for producer John Ainsworth. In 2007, he guest-starred in Sapphire and Steel: The Mystery of the Missing Hour. In 2009 he played Sir Robert Anderson, the Assistant Commissioner of Police in the Big Finish Sherlockian drama by Brian Clemens, Holmes and the Ripper and Sir Francis Walsingham in the Sixth Doctor Lost Story, Point of Entry by Marc Platt; and in 2010 played the veteran actor, Sir Jack Merrivale, star of the 1970s portmanteau movie, Doctor Demonic's Tales of Terror; or The Devil's Whisper in which he appeared as Doctor Demonic and Professor Bromley, in a Fifth Doctor story Special Features written by John Dorney as part of the CD collection The Demons of Red Lodge. In 2013 Ian recorded The Destiny of the Doctor: Shockwave with the actress, Sophie Aldred, who played Ace, the Seventh Doctor's companion for BBC AudioGo. The adventure was released in July 2013.

Film 

Films have included the historical drama, Chasing the Deer (1994) and the spoof horror film, I Bought a Vampire Motorcycle (1990). Ian starred as the paranormal investigator, Eddie Brewer, in the film The Casebook of Eddie Brewer (2012) – a Rookery Pictures production. The film was premiered at the Flatpack Festival, Birmingham in March 2012 and has gone on to be an Official Selection at fifteen other film festivals including Fright Night Film Festival, Louisville, Kentucky, the Unreal Film Festival, Memphis, and the LA Indie Festival, Mayhem Horror Festival, Nottingham, Freakshow Horror Film Festival, Orlando, Florida, and the Nevermore Film Festival, Durham, North Carolina. It has won six awards including Best New Feature Film at the 2012 Shock and Gore Film Festival at the Electric Cinema, Birmingham, Best Sci-fi or Horror Award at the 2012 Film Festival of Colorado, Best Independent Movie at the Festival of Fantastic Films, Best in Fest at the Unreal Film Festival, Memphis and Best Supernatural Movie at Midnight Black Festival of Darkness, LA. Ian won Best Actor in a Feature at Buffalo Screams Horror Film Festival at Buffalo, New York where the film was also nominated for Best International Film.

References

Ian Brooker was the shortest lived incarnation of The Doctor. He was heard briefly as the "New Doctor" at the end of the Big Finish audio drama Full Fathom Five; part of the Unbound series that depicts a series of alternative versions of the Doctor, Full Fathom Five depicts a ruthless Doctor- portrayed by David Collings- who is killed by his companion at the conclusion of the story once his deceptions are exposed, Brooker's Doctor only having time to introduce himself before he is shot again. See List of actors who have played the Doctor.

External links
 

1959 births
British male radio actors
British male film actors
British male television actors
Living people